William Codrington may refer to:
William Codrington (Royal Navy officer) (1832–1888), Junior Naval Lord
Sir William Codrington (British Army officer) (1804–1884), British general, Governor of Gibraltar and MP for Greenwich
Sir William Codrington, 1st Baronet (died 1738), of the Codrington baronets, MP for Minehead
Sir William Codrington, 2nd Baronet (1719–1792), of the Codrington baronets, MP for Tewkesbury and Beverley
Sir William Codrington, 3rd Baronet (c. 1737–1816), of the Codrington baronets
Sir William Raimond Codrington, 4th Baronet (1805–1873), of the Codrington baronets
Sir William Mary Joseph Codrington, 5th Baronet (1829–1904), of the Codrington baronets
Sir William Robert Codrington, 6th Baronet (1867–1932), of the Codrington baronets
Sir William Richard Codrington, 7th Baronet (1904–1961), of the Codrington baronets
Sir William Alexander Codrington, 8th Baronet (1934–2006), of the Codrington baronets

See also

Codrington (disambiguation)